Brian White (born 17 January 1951 in Winnipeg, Manitoba) was a Progressive Conservative party member of the House of Commons of Canada. He is a pharmacist by career.

He represented the Manitoba riding of Dauphin—Swan River where he was first elected in the 1984 federal election and re-elected in 1988, therefore becoming a member in the 33rd and 34th Canadian Parliaments.

White left federal politics in 1993 and did not campaign for a third term in the Legislature.

Electoral results

References
 

1951 births
Living people
Members of the House of Commons of Canada from Manitoba
Politicians from Winnipeg
Progressive Conservative Party of Canada MPs